The Royal New Zealand Returned and Services' Association, best known simply as the RSA, is one of the largest voluntary support organisations in New Zealand and one of the oldest organisations providing support to veterans in the world.

With Remembrance, Support and Advocacy at its core, today the RSA supports not only returned servicepersons, but all New Zealand's veterans of military service and their whānau. 

Soldiers returning from the Gallipoli Campaign founded the organisation in 1916 with the aim of serving the interests of returned soldiers and all war dependents, concentrating on the rehabilitation of returned soldiers into society. It received royal patronage in 1920 and has had the reigning monarch as its Patron since 1936. The RNZRSA celebrated its 100th Anniversary in 2016.

The RSA is a registered charity and raises funds to support veterans of military service through donations. The annual Poppy Day street appeal is iconic and sees hundreds of thousands of New Zealanders exchange a donation for a red poppy. Poppy Day is traditionally observed on the Friday before ANZAC Day (25 April), New Zealand's National Day of Commemoration.

The RSA strongly believes that Remembrance is an important part of supporting today’s serving Military Personnel. By remembering the hardships, the sacrifice and the gallant deeds of yesterday’s soldiers, we recognize the value New Zealand places on those who serve and renew our commitment to support the service personnel of today. On ANZAC Day and on other special anniversaries, the RSA plays a significant part in ceremonies of remembrance through the network of 189 local RSAs throughout New Zealand.

References

External links
 New Zealand Veterans Affairs
 Royal New Zealand Returned and Services Association

Veterans' organizations
Charities based in New Zealand
New Zealand in World War I
Organisations based in New Zealand with royal patronage